Nick Bakker (born 21 July 1992) is a Dutch footballer who plays as a centre back.

Club career
On 19 February 2012, Bakker made his Eredivisie debut against PSV. He came as a 90+2 minute substitute for Groningen's Swedish midfielder Petter Andersson. He joined Emmen in summer 2016.

On 6 September 2021, he joined Heerenveen for the 2021–22 season.

On 4 June 2022, Bakker joined Saudi Arabian side Al-Arabi on a one-year contract. On 8 September 2022, Bakker's contract was terminated by mutual consent.

International career
He made his U21 debut against Ireland on 6 February 2013.

References

External links
 
 Voetbal International profile 

Living people
1992 births
Footballers from Groningen (city)
Association football central defenders
Dutch footballers
Dutch expatriate footballers
Netherlands under-21 international footballers
Eredivisie players
Eerste Divisie players
FC Groningen players
FC Emmen players
SC Heerenveen players
Al-Arabi SC (Saudi Arabia) players
Dutch expatriate sportspeople in Saudi Arabia
Expatriate footballers in Saudi Arabia